Ahmed Adeeb Abdul Ghafoor (born 11 April 1982) is a Maldivian politician who briefly served as Vice President of Maldives in 2015. Prior to his appointment on 22 July 2015, he served as the Minister of Tourism, Arts and Culture.

Early life and education
Ahmed Adeeb was born and raised in Male' City. Adeeb is the son of Abdul Ghafoor Adam and Shaheema Mohamed. He attended the Majeediyya School for his primary education before receiving his degree from Staffordshire University in 2007. He received his Master of Business Administration Degree from Edith Cowan University in 2008.

Career 
Adeeb began his career in 2001 at Maldives Customs Services. After graduating in 2008, he started work as the Chief Operating Officer at Millennium Capital Holdings Pvt Ltd, before he got elected as the Treasurer of Maldives National Chamber of Commerce and Industries (MNCCI) the same year.

He was later elected as President of the Maldives National Chamber of Commerce and Industries (MNCCI) in 2011. On 12 February 2012 Ahmed Adeeb was sworn in as the Minister of Tourim and continued to serve until 22 July 2015 when he was appointed as the fifth Vice President of Maldives.

On 24 October 2015, it was announced that Adeeb had been arrested by Maldives police in connection with a 28 September 2015 bomb attack which targeted President Abdulla Yameen. On 5 November, Adeeb was removed from office as vice president by a no confidence vote from the People's Majlis.

Political career
After the controversial resignation of President Mohamed Nasheed on 7 February 2012, President Waheed appointed Adeeb as Tourism Minister. After Abdulla Yameen was sworn in as President of Maldives, on 17 November 2013, Adeeb was appointed as Minister of Tourism, Arts and Culture. Apart from being the Tourism Minister, Adeeb was also the chair of the Economic Council.

Following the historic decision by the Maldives’ People's Majlis to bring first amendment to the 2007 Constitution by capping the eligibility age for presidency between 30 and 65 years and thereby paving the way for a “youth” Vice President and the impeachment of Dr. Mohamed Jameel Ahmed from his vice presidency portfolio, Adeeb was appointed as vice president on 23 July 2015. His appointment was endorsed by the People's Majlis by a record majority of 78 out of 85 votes in favour.

On 24 October 2015, Adeeb was arrested following the Finifenmaa yacht explosion and was charged with high treason with the Criminal Court of Maldives passing a 15 year prison sentence against him. However, the sentence was overruled on 20 May 2019 by the High Court of Maldives.

Controversies 
Adeeb was detained by Indian authorities on 1 August 2019 after he arrived illegally by tugboat in the city of Thoothukudi, Tamil Nadu. Indian officials stated that Adeeb was detained because he did not have valid travel documents and did not arrive at a legal port of entry. Adeeb was transferred to the Maldives escorted by the Indian Coast Guard, where he was arrested by Maldivian police.

On 6 October 2020, Adeeb was sentenced to 20 years in prison, after he pleaded guilty to money laundering and embezzlement from the Maldives Marketing and Public Relations Corporation along with its managing director, Abdulla Ziyath, who received a prison sentence of 11 years.

Personal life 

Adeeb is an avid footballer. He represented club and country in youth age groups.  His love for music led to his sponsorship and event sourcing of the biggest major concert gigs in the Maldives, which included international artist Akon, as well as Bollywood stars and bands.
 
Adeeb's father served in the military and his mother worked as an executive at the Maldives Customs Service. Adeeb is married to Mariyam Nashwa and is the father of two children, daughter Eevie and son Izyan, from his previous marriage.

References

1982 births
Living people
Vice presidents of the Maldives
Culture ministers of the Maldives
Tourism ministers of the Maldives
Maldivian politicians
People from Malé
Alumni of Staffordshire University
Edith Cowan University alumni
Progressive Party of Maldives politicians
Maldivian prisoners and detainees